POxy 1464 (or P. Oxy. XII 1464) is a document that was found at the city of Oxyrhynchus in Egypt.  This document was given to a Roman citizen to certify performance of a pagan sacrifice, hence demonstrating loyalty to the authorities of the Roman Empire.  Such a document is called a libellus (plural libelli), and this was one of four libelli found at Oxyrhynchus.

The manuscript declares the date — the first year of the emperor Decius, whose full name was Gaius Messius Quintus Traianus Decius. We know the first year of his reign was 250 AD. The day and month are also given as the third of Epeiph or Epip in the Coptic calendar. So this libellus was issued on 27 June 250 AD.

Text
Original lines are retained (and numbered).
Text in [brackets] is reconstructed to fill a gap (lacuna) in the papyrus.
Text in (parentheses) is full spelling of an abbreviation.
Letters with subscript dots are incomplete or indistinct.

See also
Lapsi (Christian)
Oxyrhynchus papyri
Other libelli: POxy 658, POxy 2990, POxy 3929
Warrant to arrest a Christian: POxy 3035

References

POxy 1464
1464
POxy 1464